Faxe Kondi is a Danish soft drink produced by Royal Unibrew.

Marketed as a sports drink, as it contains both glucose and sugar. Faxe Kondi has been produced since 1971. Originally it was sold in beer bottles, because Faxe Bryggeri was a beer company.

There is also a light-version, faxe kondi zero calories, and three energy drinks, Faxe Kondi Booster (sold only in Denmark until 2019; it has also been seen in markets in Finland since), Faxe Kondi Booster Blue and Faxe Kondi Booster Red. From 2016/2017 onwards, a limited Summer edition has been released annually with a different flavouring each year.

From 1996 to 2001, Faxe Bryggeri sponsored the Faxe Kondi name in the Danish Superliga (as Faxe Kondi Ligaen) and Danish 1st Division (as Faxe Kondi Divisionen).

Availability outside Denmark

The Faxe drinks hold a particularly strong market position in Greenland, where it is bottled in Nuuk from concentrate shipped from Denmark.

In Norway, the 0.33L can versions (Regular and Light) have been sold by the Normal discount chain since the summer of 2020.

In the Faroe Islands, the 0.33L can versions are sold.

References

External links

 Danish official site
 Royal Unibrew market summary (Greenland)

Royal Unibrew brands
Carbonated drinks
Products introduced in 1971
Danish soft drinks